Hilary Gardner is an American jazz vocalist.

Career
She grew up in Wasilla, Alaska. At an early age she was attracted to the voice of Ella Fitzgerald, particularly the album Ella Fitzgerald Sings the Cole Porter Songbook. She has also expressed admiration for Patsy Cline, Aretha Franklin, Joni Mitchell, and Tom Waits. She was a member of the Alaska Children's Choir. She studied classical voice and performed with the Anchorage Opera. Her professional career began singing country music in bars in Wasilla. She moved to New York City, and for ten years she worked as a waitress.

In 2010 she appeared in Come Fly with Me, a Broadway musical choreographed by Twyla Tharp around the music of Frank Sinatra. Gardner sang in front of a 17-piece big band. Her first solo album, The Great City, was a tribute to New York. She recorded The Late Set with pianist Ehud Asherie.

In 2013 she became a member of the vocal trio Duchess with Amy Cervini and Melissa Stylianou. The group was inspired by The Boswell Sisters. The arranger is Oded Lev-Ari, co-owner of Anzic Records.

Discography

As leader and co-leader
 2014 The Great City (Anzic)
 2017 The Late Set with Ehud Asherie (Anzic)

With Duchess
 2015 Duchess (Anzic)
 2016 Laughing at Life (Anzic)

As guest
 2004 Oasis, Mike Longo
 2009 Wait for Me, Moby
 2012 For Langston, Ken Hatfield
 2014 Swing Makes You Happy!, George Gee
 2014 Boom Bang Boom Bang, Charles Ruggiero 
 2015 Certain Relationships, Art Lillard's Heavenly Band (Summit)

References

External links
 Official site

American women jazz singers
American jazz singers
People from Wasilla, Alaska